Progress M-56, identified by NASA as Progress 21P, was a Progress spacecraft used to resupply the International Space Station. It was a Progress-M 11F615A55 spacecraft, with the serial number 356.

Launch
Progress M-56 was launched by a Soyuz-U carrier rocket from Site 1/5 at the Baikonur Cosmodrome. Launch occurred at 16:03:25 UTC on 24 April 2006. Also carried to the ISS was an experimental MIT students-built picosatellite, named SPHERE, that will float inside the station, strictly maintaining its location inside.

Docking
The spacecraft docked with the aft port of the Zvezda module at 17:41:31 UTC on 26 April 2006. It remained docked for 146 days before undocking at 00:28:17 UTC on 19 September 2006 to make way for Soyuz TMA-9. It was deorbited at 03:28 UTC on 19 September 2006. The spacecraft burned up in the atmosphere over the Pacific Ocean, with any remaining debris landing in the ocean at around 04:14:40 UTC.

Progress M-56 carried supplies to the International Space Station, including food, water and oxygen for the crew and equipment for conducting scientific research.

See also

 List of Progress flights
 Uncrewed spaceflights to the International Space Station

References

Spacecraft launched in 2006
Progress (spacecraft) missions
Spacecraft which reentered in 2006
Supply vehicles for the International Space Station
Spacecraft launched by Soyuz-U rockets